Wellwood Herries Maxwell (15 October 1817 – 13 August 1900) was a Scottish Liberal politician who sat in the House of Commons from 1868 to 1874.

Maxwell was the son of John Herries Maxwell of Munches in Buittle. He was educated at the Edinburgh Academy, at the University of Edinburgh, and at Exeter College, Oxford. In 1839 he was called to the bar in Scotland. He was a director of the Glasgow and South Western Railway. He was a deputy lieutenant and J.P. for the Stewartry of Kirkcudbright and Convener of the Commissioners of Supply of Kirkcudbright.

Maxwell was elected Member of Parliament for Kirkcudbright Stewartry at a by-election on 30 January 1868. He held the seat until the 1874 general election.

Maxwell married in 1844 Jane Home Jardine, daughter of Sir William Jardine, Bt. His son William Herries Maxwell was MP for Dumfrieshire.

References

External links
 

1817 births
1900 deaths
Members of the Parliament of the United Kingdom for Scottish constituencies
Scottish Liberal Party MPs
UK MPs 1865–1868
UK MPs 1868–1874
People educated at Edinburgh Academy
Alumni of the University of Edinburgh
Alumni of Exeter College, Oxford
Deputy Lieutenants of Kirkcudbright